Droa! is a political party in Georgia founded by former Deputy Minister of the State Ministry for Euro-Atlantic Integration of Georgia, former Member of the Parliament and candidate in Tbilisi mayoral elections 2017,  Elene Khoshtaria. The presentation of the party was held in 2021.

Notable members

 Batu Kutelia - Ambassador of Georgia to the United States of America from 2008 to 2011.
 Vasil Sikharulidze - Ambassador to the United States 2006-2008 and Georgia's Minister of Defence 2008–2009.
 Nino Goguadze - Member of the Parliament of the 8th convocation of Georgia (2012-2016)

Electoral results

Local elections

Tbilisi city assembly election results

References

External links
 

Political parties in Georgia (country)
Pro-European political parties in Georgia (country)
Political parties established in 2021